Imeni Karla Libknekhta is the name of several inhabited localities in Russia:
Imeni Karla Libknekhta, Kursk Oblast, an urban locality (a work settlement) in Kursk Oblast
Imeni Karla Libknnekhta, Republic of Tatarstan, a rural locality (a village) in the Republic of Tatarstan

See also
Karla Libknekhta, a rural locality (a khutor) in Rostov Oblast
Libknekhta, a rural locality (a khutor) in Volgograd Oblast